Pieter Aspe (officially Pierre Aspeslag; 3 April 1953 – 1 May 2021) was a Belgian writer of a series of detective stories starring inspector Pieter Van In. These were adapted for the long-running TV series  (2004–14) starring . He died at the age of 68 years.

Bibliography

Novels
From 2000 on Aspe published two books annually. 

Note: book 40 'Blankenberge Blues' written with co-author Johan Strobbe

Note: ISBN numbers with 978-99-032...  are taken from the second edition of the book (published in general 3 years after the first edition)

Other books
 Grof wild (1998)
 De Japanse Tuin
 Kat en Muis
 De Laatste Rit
 De Oxymorontheorie (2015)
 Books for youngsters (youth)
 Bloedband
 Luchtpost

See also
 Flemish literature

Reference

1953 births
2021 deaths
Writers from Bruges
Belgian crime fiction writers
Flemish writers